System 3 Football Club is a football club based in Kingstown, St Vincent and the Grenadines.
They currently play in the NLA Premier League.

History
System 3 FC was founded in 1997. The club has become a well known force in Vincentian Football. Having placed 2nd in the NLA Premier League, they qualified for the first round of the 2010 CFU Club Championship where they eventually progressed to the Second Round and subsequently lost to Bayamón FC of Puerto Rico

Squad

Achievements
NLA Premier League: 1
2016

CFU Club Championship: 1 appearance
2010 – Second Round

Managerial history 
Kendale Mercury (2010)
Wayde Jackson

External links
St. Vincent and the Grenadines Football Federation

References

Football clubs in Saint Vincent and the Grenadines
1997 establishments in Saint Vincent and the Grenadines
Association football clubs established in 1997